Qırmızı Şəfəq is a village in the municipality of Yenikənd in the Neftchala Rayon of Azerbaijan.

References

Populated places in Neftchala District